The Big Picture is an album by American jazz saxophonist Rob Brown recorded in 2003 and released on the French Marge label. It features a quartet with trumpeter Roy Campbell, bassist Willam Parker and drummer Hamid Drake. These four musicians were in Paris to play at the 2003 edition of the Sons d'Hiver festival with two different bands: Campbell's Pyramid Trio and Parker's Raining on the Moon quintet, and producer Gérard Terronès got them into the studio.

Reception
The All About Jazz review by Rex Butters states "These four veteran collaborators create their signature sound of abundant grace, heartbreaking beauty, and righteous swing bleeding blues."

Track listing
All compositions by Rob Brown
 "Dawning" – 9:38
 "Islands of Space" – 10:11 
 "Wyoming Song" – 11:01
 "Trio Unsprung" – 7:42
 "Blues Thicket" – 10:10
 "Legroom" – 14:23

Personnel
Rob Brown – alto sax, flute
Roy Campbell - trumpet, pocket trumpet, flugelhorn
William Parker – bass
Hamid Drake – drums

References

2004 albums
Rob Brown (saxophonist) albums
Marge Records albums